Vladoje is a Serbo-Croatian masculine given name, derived from the Slavic element vlad meaning "to rule, ruler" and the suffix -oje. It is attested in Serbian society since the Middle Ages. The patronymic surname Vladojević is derived from the name. It may refer to:

Vladoje (tepčija) ( 1326), Serbian nobleman
Vladoje Aksmanović "Viktor Axmann" (1878–1946), Croatian architect
 (1861–1944), Croatian academic

See also
Vladojevići, village in Bosnia
Mladen Vladojević, Serbian magnate
Slavic names

References

Sources
 

Serbian masculine given names
Croatian masculine given names